Guy Lefranc (21 October 1919 - 1 February 1994) was a French director and screenwriter.

Filmography

References

External links
 

1919 births
1994 deaths
French male screenwriters
20th-century French screenwriters
Film directors from Paris
20th-century French male writers